Vision Research is a peer-reviewed scientific journal specializing in the neuroscience and psychology of the visual system of humans and other animals. The journal is abstracted and indexed in PubMed. The journal's impact factor for 2020 was 1.886 and its 5-year impact factor was 2.823.

External links 
 
 All articles
Vision
Neuroscience journals
Elsevier academic journals
Publications established in 1961
Monthly journals
English-language journals
Perception journals